Purt Castle or Port Castle is a ruined Geraldine castle near Abbeyfeale, County Limerick, Ireland. The castle is known variously as 'Purt Castle', 'Port Castle', or 'Portrinard Castle' in sources. 

The remains of the castle are situated in the townland of Port about 2 km northwest of the town of Abbeyfeale, on the north bank of the River Feale.

Originally built by the Earls of Desmond in the 15th century, a plaque on the site indicates that it was destroyed  during the Second Desmond Rebellion. Only fragmentary remains of the rectangular tower house still stand.

References

Castles in County Limerick